Mackey Arena is located in West Lafayette, Indiana. Part of the Purdue University campus, it is home to the university's basketball teams, and occasionally hosts home games for the volleyball and wrestling teams. The arena opened in 1967 as a replacement for Lambert Fieldhouse.

History
Originally named Purdue Arena, it was renamed in 1972 to honor Purdue alumnus and long time athletic director Guy "Red" Mackey.  On December 12, 1997, the floor was renamed Keady Court in honor of longtime men's coach Gene Keady. The circular arena, similar to several built in the 1960s, seats 14,804, and is considered by many as one of the loudest arenas in the nation due to its domed aluminum roof.

Renovations
In recent years, Mackey Arena has experienced numerous upgrades and improvements, including:
1997 - New playing surface and basketball hoops installed 
1998 - Roof repainted 
2000 - New bleachers installed
2002 - Women's basketball locker room renovated
2002 - Men's basketball locker room renovated
2003 - Video and meeting room for women's basketball constructed
2003 - Team championship and Consensus All-American jersey banners hung
2003 - Men's basketball player lounge renovated  
2003 - Lower press row reconstructed
2003 - Press conference and media work room renovated
2004 - Video board installed
2004 - Sound system installed  
2005 - Playing surface refinished
2007-2012 - Mackey Complex Project
2011 - New playing surface installed after water damage 
2016 - Playing surface replaced after a flood due to a broken water main
2017 - Center video board and stat boards replaced and upgraded, new LED ribbons installed above both baselines

NCAA Tournament 
Mackey Arena hosted first and second round games of the 1980 NCAA tournament. The arena also hosted the First Four and first round games of the 2021 tournament.

Mackey Arena Complex Project

On May 18, 2007, the university's board of trustees voted to award a contract to HNTB Architecture of Kansas City, Mo., for a $99.5 million project that extends from the outer edges of the arena north along Northwestern Avenue to Cherry Lane. A three-level structure is planned north of Mackey and currently is being referred to as the Student-Athlete Development Center. Its highlights include: 
A sports medicine facility approximately three and a half to four times larger than the current area in Mackey. 
A strength and weight training facility approximately four times larger than the existing Intercollegiate Athletic Facility weight room. 
An oversized basketball practice facility, including Danielle and Brian Cardinal Court and three breakout shooting areas.
The Drew and Britney Brees Student Athlete Academic Center, towards which the couple donated $2 million in the fall of 2007.
New playing surface for Keady Court
Reseating of the Paint Crew for the 2011-2012 season
Proposed visitors tunnel on be cut into the southeast lower bowl seating area
Interactive fan elements and coaching technologies in concourse

The concourse width will be approximately doubled, concessions will increase four times (from 12 to 48 points of sale) and restrooms will increase three times for women and by 35% for men. In addition, the lower seating sections on the east side will be modified to allow for some premium seats, with club seats (fixed padded stadium chairs) and loge seats (office-style chairs on casters) provided. A limited number of premium courtside seats will be available in the west pit area. Accessible seating will increase approximately six times. Two club spaces will be created, one for general fans on the west side and a premium club to the east.

See also
 List of NCAA Division I basketball arenas

References

External links
 Mackey Arena at PurdueSports.com
 Mackey Arena Profile from the Lafayette Journal & Courier
 Mackey Arena Renovation Page

Purdue Boilermakers basketball
Basketball venues in Indiana
College basketball venues in the United States
West Lafayette, Indiana
1967 establishments in Indiana
Wrestling venues in Indiana
Volleyball venues in Indiana
Gymnastics venues in Indiana